Jane Seymour is an English actress. She rose to prominence in a leading role in the television series The Onedin Line (1972–1973) and as Bond girl Solitaire in the James Bond film Live and Let Die (1973). From 1993 to 1998, Seymour starred as Dr. Michaela Quinn in the television series Dr. Quinn, Medicine Woman, earning her two Primetime Emmy Award nominations and four Golden Globe nominations, winning once in 1995. For her role in the miniseries Captains and the Kings (1976), Seymour was awarded the Primetime Emmy Award for Outstanding Lead Actress in a Limited Series or Movie. In 1982, Seymour won her first Golden Globe for Best Actress in a Miniseries or Television Film for the miniseries East of Eden (1981). She received additional Golden Globe nominations in the same category for the television film The Woman He Loved (1988), in which she portrayed Wallis Simpson, and the miniseries War and Remembrance (1988-1989), for which she was nominated twice consecutively in addition to receiving another Emmy nomination. By this time, Seymour had won a Primetime Emmy Award for Outstanding Supporting Actress in a Limited Series or Movie for Onassis: The Richest Man in the World (1988), in which she played Maria Callas.

Seymour's other notable roles include in the films Somewhere in Time (1980), The Scarlet Pimpernel (1982), La Révolution française (1989), and Wedding Crashers (2005), as well as recurring roles in Battlestar Galactica (1978), Smallville (2004-2005), The Kominsky Method (2019, 2021) and B Positive (2021-2022).

Filmography

Film

Television movies

Television

References

External links
Jane Seymour at the Internet Movie Database

Actress filmographies
British filmographies